The Local Transport Act 2008 (c 26) is an Act of the Parliament of the United Kingdom.

Section 134 - Commencement
Orders made under this section:
The Local Transport Act 2008 (Commencement No. 1 and Transitional Provisions) Order 2009 (S.I. 2009/107 (C.8))
The Local Transport Act 2008 (Commencement No. 1 and Transitional Provisions) (Wales) Order 2009 (S.I. 2009/579 (W.55))
The Local Transport Act 2008 (Commencement No. 2 and Transitional Provision) Order 2009 (S.I. 2009/3242 (C.142))
The Local Transport Act 2008 (Commencement No. 2) (Wales) Order 2009 (S.I. 2009/3294 (W. 291) (C. 146))

References
Halsbury's Statutes,

External links
The Local Transport Act 2008, as amended from the National Archives.
The Local Transport Act 2008, as originally enacted from the National Archives.
Explanatory notes to the Local Transport Act 2008.

United Kingdom Acts of Parliament 2008
History of transport in the United Kingdom
Transport legislation
2008 in transport